Modelo is a Spanish word for model. It may also refer to:

Modelo, Santa Catarina, a city located in Santa Catarina, Brazil
Building model
Car model
Airplane model

Arts
"La Modelo", song by José Capmany
"La Modelo", song by Ozuna
Fashion models

Companies
Modelo Continente, a company, owner of the largest hypermarket (Continente) and supermarket (Modelo) chains of Portugal
Grupo Modelo, a large brewery in Mexico
Modelo Brewery, a brewery in Havana, Cuba

Prisons 
 Presidio Modelo, a prison of Panopticon design in Cuba
 La Modelo, a prison in Colombia
 Cárcel Modelo, a prison in Madrid

See also
 Las modelos (disambiguation)